Mattias Hugosson (born 24 January 1974) is a Swedish former footballer who played as a goalkeeper.

Career
He came to Gefle IF in 1998 from Forsbacka IK. In 2004, he had the highest save percentage in Superettan as his team were promoted to Allsvenskan. During the 2011 Allsvenskan he kept a clean sheet for 699 minutes straight, the fourth longest time in league history. Hugosson played every single minute of the club's first 228 games in Allsvenskan after Gefle IF was promoted. He finally missed out on playing in the first round of 2013 due to fever. On 6 August 2014, he made a comeback as third-choice goalkeeper in IFK Göteborg. Signed in May 2016 by his longtime former team, Gefle IF as an emergency back-up when first choice Andreas Andersson suffered a serious knee injury.

References

External links
 

1974 births
Living people
Swedish footballers
Gefle IF players
IFK Göteborg players
Allsvenskan players
Association football goalkeepers